Blažić (Cyrillic script: Блажић) or Blažič is a South Slavic surname, derived from the masculine first name Blaž, a form of the name Blaise. It may refer to:

Antun Blažić (1916–1943), Croatian Jewish Partisan
Borka Jerman Blažič, Slovenian computer scientist and internet pioneer
Branislav Blažić (1957–2020), Serbian surgeon and politician
Dragoljub Blažić (1936-1991). Yugoslav footballer
Larisa Blazic (born 1970), British video installation artist and academic
Jaka Blažič (born 1990), Slovenian basketball player
Marko Blažić (born 1999), Croatian water polo player
Marko Blažić (born 1985), Serbian footballer
Miha Blažič (born 1980), Slovenian musician and songwriter, known by the stage name N'toko
Miha Blažič (born 1993), Slovenian footballer
Milena Mileva Blažić (born 1956), Slovenian literary historian and professor
Sergio Blažić (1951-1987), Croatian hard rock musician
Srđan Blažić (born 1982), Montenegrin football player
Viktor Blažič (1928–2014), Slovenian journalist, essayist, translator and former anti-Communist dissident

Serbian surnames
Croatian surnames
Patronymic surnames